Protein asunder homolog (Asun) also known as cell cycle regulator Mat89Bb homolog (Mat89Bb) is a protein that in humans is encoded by the Asun gene.

References

Further reading